Bulman is a British television crime drama series, principally written and created by Murray Smith. It was first broadcast on ITV on 5 June 1985. The series, featuring retired ex-cop George Bulman (Don Henderson) and his assistant Lucy McGinty (Siobhan Redmond), was a spin-off from the 1978 TV series Strangers, itself a spin-off of the 1976 TV series The XYY Man, which was adapted from the novels of Kenneth Royce. Produced by Granada Television, Bulman ran for two series, with the final episode broadcast on 8 August 1987.

In this incarnation, Don Henderson once again stars as former Detective Chief Inspector George Bulman, who is ostensibly retired from police work and now spends his spare time repairing old clocks. However, aside from fixing clocks, Bulman is also working as a private investigator, and even has an assistant, Lucy McGinty. Aside from a number of private clients, Bulman and Lucy are frequently drawn into the clandestine world of the secret service through the machinations of security chief Bill Dugdale (Thorley Walters), and also find themselves helping the police with cases under the instruction of Bulman's former boss Jack Lambie (Mark McManus). Bulman's former assistant, Derek Willis (Dennis Blanch), also appears in two episodes.

Both series were released on DVD via the Network imprint on 1 July 2013; however, these have since gone out of production. A complete box set was released on 20 August 2018, again via Network Distributing.

Cast
 Don Henderson as George Bulman
 Siobhan Redmond as Lucy McGinty
 Thorley Walters as William 'Bill' Dugdale (Series 1 — Episodes 4, 6, 7 & 13; Series 2 — Episodes 5 & 7)
 John Benfield as DI Holmes (Series 1 — Episodes 1, 5 & 11)
 Mark McManus as DCS Jack Lambie (Series 1 — Episodes 1, 2 & 13)
 Simon Molloy as DS Mackay (Series 1 — Episodes 1, 5 & 7)
 Dennis Blanch as DS Derek Willis (Series 1 — Episodes 1 & 3)
 Jeremy Gagan as DCI Faulkner (Series 1 — Episodes 1 & 3)

Episodes

Series overview

Series 1 (1985)

Series 2 (1987)

References

External links
 

British crime television series
ITV television dramas
1985 British television series debuts
1987 British television series endings
English-language television shows
1980s British drama television series
British television spin-offs
Television series by ITV Studios
Television shows set in Manchester
Television shows produced by Granada Television